Partial general elections were held in Belgium on 11 June 1870. In the elections for the Chamber of Representatives the Liberal Party and the Catholic Party both won 61 seats, resulting in a hung parliament. Voter turnout was 60%, although only 51,435 people were eligible to vote. Consequently, early elections were held two months later.

Under the alternating system, elections for the Chamber of Representatives were only held in four out of the nine provinces: Hainaut, Limburg, Liège and East Flanders.

Results

Chamber of Representatives

See also
Belgium and the Franco-Prussian War

References

1870 1
General
Belgium
Belgium